The 2006–07 Nevada Wolf Pack men's basketball team represented the University of Nevada, Reno during the 2006–07 NCAA Division I men's basketball season. The Wolf Pack, led by head coach Mark Fox, played their home games at the Lawlor Events Center on their campus in Reno, Nevada as members of the Western Athletic Conference (WAC).

After finishing atop the conference regular season standings, Nevada lost in the championship game of the WAC tournament, and received an at-large bid to the NCAA tournament as No. 7 seed in the South Region. The Wolf Pack defeated No. 10 seed Creighton in the opening round before losing to No. 2 seed Memphis in the second round. The team finished with a record of 29–5 (14–2 WAC).

Roster

Schedule and results

|-
!colspan=9 style=| Regular season

|-
!colspan=9 style=| WAC tournament

|-
!colspan=9 style=| NCAA tournament

Source

Rankings

Awards and honors
Nick Fazekas – WAC Player of the Year
Mark Fox – WAC Coach of the Year

References

Nevada Wolf Pack men's basketball seasons
Nevada
Nevada
Nevada Wolf Pack
Nevada Wolf Pack